Parliamentary elections were held in Ivory Coast on 10 November 1985. At the time the country was a one-party state with the Democratic Party of Ivory Coast – African Democratic Rally (PDCI-RDA) as the sole legal party. 546 PDCI-RDA candidates contested the 175 seats (up from 147 at the previous election). Voter turnout was reported to be just 45.7%.

Results

References

Ivory
1985 in Ivory Coast
Elections in Ivory Coast
One-party elections
November 1985 events in Africa
Election and referendum articles with incomplete results